Yan Chai Hospital is a Charitable hospital has under the Kowloon West Cluster of the Hospital Authority, providing acute and extended care services to the Tsuen Wan community and its neighbouring areas. The hospital was founded by the Yan Chai Hospital Board of Directors in 1973.

History
Yan Chai Hospital opened its doors to patients on 28 August 1973, and was officially opened on 24 October that year by the Hong Kong Governor, Murray MacLehose. The hospital was built and equipped at a cost of about HK$5.5 million, of which HK$1.7 million was funded by the Hong Kong Government, HK$0.4 million by the Royal Hong Kong Jockey Club, and the rest by the directors of the hospitals.

References

External links

 Yen Chai Hospital

Hospitals in Hong Kong
Tsuen Wan District